Austin is an underground MTR rapid transit station on the  in Hong Kong, situated perpendicular to Wui Cheung Road and Austin Road West, and formerly adjacent to Jordan Road Ferry Pier Bus Terminus.

History
KCR Corporation originally planned two stations along the new section of line: Austin and Canton Road stations. The latter station was cancelled due to failed negotiations with private landowners. As a result, Austin was the only new station built as part of the Kowloon Southern Link scheme. It is also the first KCR-owned station to be opened after the MTR took over operations of the KCR network.

During the planning and early construction stages, the station was called "West Kowloon station". The construction contract KDB200 (West Kowloon Station and Tunnels – Jordan Road to East Tsim Sha Tsui Station) was awarded to the Leighton-Balfour Beatty-Kumagai-John Holland Joint Venture (renamed to "Link 200 Joint Venture" on 9 August 2005) for an estimated contract sum of HK$2.018 billion. This station is part of this contract. Construction was finished in July 2009 and the station opened on 16 August that year.

It was located adjacent to the Canton Road Government Offices until that structure was demolished in 2011. An MTR residential property development, The Austin, was subsequently constructed on the site of the former government offices.

A direct connection between Austin station and the West Kowloon Terminus was opened on 23 September 2018.

A new underground pedestrian link between Austin station and Xiqu Centre, a Chinese opera house, was opened on 21 March 2021.

Hence, Austin was included in the project and is now an intermediate station on the Tuen Ma line.

Station layout

The station has two tracks and one island platform. The surface station building is divided into two parts by Wui Cheung Road.

Airport Express passengers can travel around the two stations by walking through Exit B5 of this station or using the complimentary Airport Express shuttle bus service. However, it only provides out-of-system connection to Kowloon station for   passengers with gate charges.

Exits A and F are respectively connected with the pedestrian subways at the Jordan Road and the Austin Road junctions with Canton Road. But unlike cases like the subway at the Ngau Tau Kok station, the other exits of these two subways connected to Austin are not numbered.

Entrances/exits
Northern concourse
 A: Jordan Road 
 B1/B2/B3: Wui Cheung Road 
 B4:  
 B5: Elements, Kowloon Station 
 C: Hong Kong West Kowloon Station 
Southern concourse
 D1/D2/D3: Austin Road West 
 D4: Hong Kong West Kowloon Station 
 E: Xiqu Centre 
 F: China Ferry Terminal, Austin Road & Xiqu Centre

See also

References

MTR stations in Kowloon
West Rail line
Tuen Ma line
Kwun Chung
West Kowloon
Railway stations in Hong Kong opened in 2009
2009 establishments in Hong Kong